Korean Progressive Network Center, also known as Jinbonet is a nine-year-old organization in Seoul, South Korea.  Jinbonet is a network that provides ICT services (web hosting, mailing list, webmail) to that country's progressive movement, civil society and workers unions.

Best internet infrastructure, concern over rights
The Korean Confederation of Trade Unions has been one of the biggest group they have been hosting to. In a country which has one of the best internet infrastructures—technically speaking—in the world, concern over the rights of the citizen in cyberspace are strong, and Jinbonet helps focus on some of these issues.

After 1997 media conference
Kim Jeong-woo, a.k.a. PatchA is Jinbonet's ICT policy coordinator. This network was formed in the aftermath of a 1997 international labour media conference in Seoul, where participants focused on the importance of independent network for progressive communication in South Korea.

‘Progressive’
In 1998, Jinbonet was originally launched. ‘Jinbo’ means progressive in the local Korean language. It at present has eight full-time activists, apart from other volunteers.

As of 2006, Jinbonet had reported that it was providing hosting service for 600 civil society organisations, on their LAMP (Linux-Apache-MySQL-PhP) servers. This includes farmers' groups, civil movement, unionists, the women's movement, and human rights campaigners, among others.

"Difficult in imbibing international mindset"
"Koreans (in civil society) have a difficulty to imbibe an international mindset. Koreans civil society organizations think that international solidarity is very important, in the age of globalisation. Specially the struggle against neo-liberalisation, WTO-attack or FTA-attack. International solidarity is one of the most important strategy. But in Korea it is difficult to use ICT for international solidarity because of the language problem", PatchA of Jinbonet has been quoted saying.

Issues raised
Some of the issues raised by Jinbonet recently include the Free Trade Agreement signed between South Korea and the United States, and, in particular, its implications on "intellectual property rights" issues. The Internet Realname System(IRS) legislation passed in 2004 is another issue taken up and raised by Jinbonet.

Internet Realname System
Under this law, the New Media and websites would be needed to install an Internet Realname System on their bulletin boards or comment board, thus compelling them to certify the identity of the person posting comments—a move seen by campaigners like Jinbonet as affecting privacy and free speech on the Net.

Its website says, “No copyright, Just copyleft!”

Tech progress, socially lagging behind
South Korea has a significant online population—out of a total population of 50 million, broadband registrations cross 11 million, and internet users total 30 million. Some 70% of the population is seen to have access to the net. High-tech tools like IPTV have been introduce, as has e-learning.

But in terms of policies, critics and campaigners see South Korea as being at a "low level". PatchA of Jinbonet has argued that this is probably because "the government-driven and market-driven ICT sector is not focused on the people's needs."

External links
Jinbonet

Internet in South Korea
Non-profit organizations based in South Korea
Information technology organizations based in Asia
Progressivism in South Korea